The Federal Radio Commission's (FRC) General Order 40, dated August 30, 1928, described the standards for a sweeping reorganization of radio broadcasting in the United States. This order grouped the AM radio band transmitting frequencies into three main categories, which became known as Clear Channel, Regional, and Local. It also included provisions for coordination with Canadian station assignments. The majority of the reassignments resulting from the plan's implementation went into effect on November 11, 1928.

Background
Radio transmissions in the United States were originally regulated by the Department of Commerce, as authorized by the Radio Act of 1912. The first formal regulations governing broadcasts intended for the general public were adopted effective December 1, 1921. This initially established just two transmitting wavelengths — 360 meters (833 kHz) for "entertainment" broadcasts, and 485 meters (619 kHz) for "market news and weather reports". The number of broadcasting stations grew dramatically in 1922, reaching over 500 by the end of the year, and the government began making available additional frequencies. By November 1924 a band of frequencies, from 550 to 1500 kHz, had been established, with higher-powered stations, known as "Class B", assigned to the frequencies from 550 to 1070, while lower-powered "Class A" stations were assigned to 1080 to 1500.

In 1926, the government's regulatory authority under the 1912 Radio Act was successfully challenged, and, for a chaotic period that lasted until early 1927, radio stations were free to use any frequency and power they chose, while the number of stations increased to 732. The Radio Act of 1927 was passed to regain control of the situation. The Act established a Federal Radio Commission, which reduced the number of stations, including eliminating "temporary" and "portable" stations. The Commission also reallocated frequency assignments to reduce interference and provide better service to smaller communities and underserved rural areas. A constraint was the Davis Amendment, which specified that the station assignments had to be equitably made throughout the country.

Two technical issues limited the number of stations that could operate without interfering with each other. These issues were especially important at night, when a change in the ionosphere meant that radio signals traveled much greater distances. Most transmitters at this time were unable to precisely control their output frequencies, thus, signals from two stations operating on the same nominal frequency would combine to make a high-pitched "heterodyne" tone that interfered with the reception of both stations. Secondly, directional antennas would not be developed until the early 1930s, so there was no effective method for limiting signals in a given direction.

General Order 40 provisions

On August 30, 1928, the Commission issued General Order 40, which set new standards for radio broadcasting. A "broadcast band" was defined, consisting of 96 frequencies, spaced every 10 kilohertz, from 550 to 1500 kHz. Six of them—690, 730, 840, 910, 960, and 1030—were restricted for use only by Canadian stations, leaving 90 available for US assignment. The country was further divided into five zones, to coordinate the Davis Amendment directive of an equitable assignment of stations.

Clear channels
Forty of the U.S. frequencies—eight in each zone—which came to be known as "Clear Channels", were generally limited nationally to a single station. The maximum power for these stations was to be determined later, and in most cases was set at 50,000 watts. In some cases, secondary stations were assigned the same frequency, with provisions to avoid interference with the primary station's coverage by locating the secondary stations long distances from the primary stations, limiting their power, or restricting them to daytime-only operation.

Due to a lack of Clear Channel frequencies, in several cases two stations were assigned the same frequency and required to share time on them:
770 KFAB in Lincoln, Nebraska and WBBM in Chicago, Illinois. To avoid interference, at night KFAB carried the same network programming as WBBM and the stations closely synchronized their transmissions.
820 WFAA in Dallas, Texas and WBAP in Fort Worth, Texas. Eventually, these stations also shared a second, regional frequency (570), and until 1970 alternated between the two frequencies every 12 hours.
850 KWKH in Shreveport, Louisiana and WWL in New Orleans, Louisiana.
870 WLS and WENR, both in Chicago, Illinois. This continued until 1959 when ABC purchased both stations and WENR was deleted.
1000 WHO in Des Moines, Iowa and WOC in Davenport, Iowa. Both stations unsuccessfully fought the shared allocation. Initially the two stations transmitted the same programs using synchronized transmitters, but eventually WHO bought out WOC and consolidated operations as WHO-WOC in Des Moines. Still later WOC was split-off, leaving just WHO.
1070 WBAL in Baltimore, Maryland and WTIC in Hartford, Connecticut.
1160 WOWO in Fort Wayne, Indiana and WWVA in Wheeling, West Virginia.

Zone 5 Clear Channel frequency 790 kHz was assigned to General Electric's (GE) KGO in Oakland, California. Because of the separation between the stations, GE's WGY in Schenectady, New York was also assigned this frequency, but with KGO's power limited to 7,500 watts, until a directional antenna became feasible and KGO's power could be raised to 50,000 watts. KGO is the General Order 40 station on 790/810 kHz, not WGY.

Zone 2 Clear Channel frequency 1020 kHz was initially used by a high-powered station in Zone 4, KYW in Chicago, Illinois. This discrepancy was resolved when KYW moved to Philadelphia in 1934, and the Philadelphia station previously on 1020, WRAX, moved to regional frequency 920 kHz, sharing time with WPEN.

Regional frequencies
44 frequencies, later known as "Regional", were designated to be used concurrently by stations in multiple zones. 40 of these frequencies had power limits of 1,000 watts, while the remaining four, 1460-1490, referred to as "Super Regional", had 5,000-watt limits. In numerous cases up to four stations in a given location were assigned the same frequency, requiring them to establish time-sharing agreements.

Local frequencies
The remaining six frequencies—1200, 1210, 1310, 1370, 1420 and 1500—later known as "Local", were issued to stations in all five zones, with a power limit of 100 watts.

Effects
The reorganization greatly reduced interference caused by the chaos that resulted from the earlier collapse of regulation. There was some controversy that the assignments had created groups of "have" and "have-not" stations—with the Clear Channel stations receiving a major economic boost, while many remaining stations, often with limited hours due to time-sharing, had constricted futures. Also, although the reorganization accounted for Canada, it did not include other nearby countries, most notably Mexico. Twelve years later this omission was addressed by the North American Regional Broadcasting Agreement (NARBA), which took effect March 29, 1941.

November 11, 1928 assignments
General Order 40's implementation took effect at 3 a.m. Eastern time on November 11, 1928, and required most U.S. radio stations to move to a new broadcast frequency. A survey conducted by Radio Retailing magazine concluded that, despite some continuing issues, the changes meant that "on the whole, the broadcasting situation has been much improved".

The table below presents a general outline of the allocations made under the order. For "Clear" frequencies, the zone of that frequency's principal station is listed, followed by the principal station's call letters and location, then the frequency that had been previously used by the principal station, and any additional stations assigned to that frequency. Bolded stations' call signs are the original primary assignments, while call signs shown in parentheses were owned by the same licensee as the principal station. The additional stations on a frequency were: 1) shared allocations, 2) daytimers, or 3) secondary stations which eventually achieved full-time status, but at lower power or using a directional antenna that protected the primary station's coverage.

See also
North American Regional Broadcasting Agreement
Federal Radio Commission

References

External links
"Behind the Clear Channel Matter" by Mark Durenberger. Six article series reviewing the history of clear-channel AM radio stations.

Broadcast law
Radio in the United States
United States communications regulation